That's What I'm Talking About is the debut studio album by Australian singer Shannon Noll, released on 9 February 2004 (see 2004 in music) and debuted at number 1 on the ARIA Charts. The album includes his number one, 4× platinum debut single, "What About Me".

Track listing
"Drive" (Phil Thornalley/Bryan Adams) – 3:58
"New Beginning" (Thomas Who/Negin) – 4:00
"What About Me" (Garry Frost/Frances Frost) – 3:21
"Burn" (Jeff Franzel/Ty Lacy/Jess Cates) – 3:37
"Sittin' Pretty" (Mark Jaimes/Danny Saxon/Andy Wright/Ronan Cavanagh) – 3:40
"Learn to Fly" (Peter Gordann/Rick Mitra/Christian Ingebrigtsen/Christopher Porter) – 4:12
"Promises" (Nikolaj Steen) – 3:44
"Tune In" (Ole Jorgen Olsen) – 3:43
"Prove" (Adam Riley) – 3:57
"Wise" (James Kempster/Simon Hosford/Gene Cook) – 3:39
"The Way She Loved Me" (Glenn Cunningham) – 3:21
"The Way That I Feel" (Shannon Noll/Damian Noll) – 3:30

Limited edition copies of the album were housed in a slipcase and also contained a bonus disc containing the following tracks:

"Angels Brought Me Here" (Jorgan Elofsson/John Reid)
"With or Without You" (Recorded live on Australian Idol: Up Close and Personal) (A. Clayton/L. Mullen/D. Evans/P. Hewson)

Charts
The album debuted at number-one on the Australian Albums Chart with sales of 131,680 copies. The album remained at the top spot for four weeks. The album spent a total of thirteen weeks in the top ten.

Weekly charts

Year-end charts

Decade-end charts

Certifications

Release history

See also
 List of number-one albums of 2004 (Australia)
 List of best-selling albums of the 2000s in Australia

References

Shannon Noll albums
2004 debut albums
Sony BMG albums